Quinapyramine is a trypanocidal agent for veterinary use.

References 

Antiparasitic agents
Quaternary ammonium compounds
Aminopyrimidines
Quinolines